Imanaliroso is a rural locality (a selo) in Artlukhsky Selsoviet, Kazbekovsky District, Republic of Dagestan, Russia. The population was 310 as of 2010.

Nationalities 
Avars live there.

Geography
Imanaliroso is located 32 km southeast of Dylym (the district's administrative centre) by road. Gertma and Guni are the nearest rural localities.

References 

Rural localities in Kazbekovsky District